Newalkar dynasty were Marathi Karhade Brahmins, who were the Maharajas of Jhansi from 1769 to 1858. Their family deity was goddess Mahalakshmi. The Newalkars were sardars under Peshwa Madhavrao I, and later became Maharajas of Jhansi in Central India as an independent member of the Maratha Empire until 1818. Later, their kingdom became a princely state under the protectorate of British India.

The dynasty was founded with Raghunath Hari Newalkar, who joined the service of the Peshwas of the Maratha Empire, and quickly rose to the ranks of Subedar. The Newalkar Maharajas of Jhansi are a great patron of arts and music. The name of the dynasty was associated with the title of the ruler, who was known informally as Newalkar Maharaja.

Newalkar Maharajas of Jhansi
The rulers from this dynasty are as follows:

 Raghunath Rao of Jhansi (a.k.a. Raghunath Hari Newalkar; 1769–1796)
 Shiv Hari Rao (1796–1811)
 Ramchandra Rao (1806–1835; Sakku Bai was regent at his minority, 1811–1835)
 Raghunath Rao III (1835–1838)"Maharajadhiraj Fidvi Badshah Jamjah Inglistan", i.e. "faithful servant of the glorious king of England"
 Sakku Bai as regent of Krishna Rao II (November 1838-5 January 1839)
 Gangadhar Rao (1843–21 November 1853)
Rani Lakshmi Bai (21 November 1853–10 March 1854; as regent of Damodar Rao of Jhansi from 4 June 1857–4/5 April 1858)

Queens 
Some of the known Queens:
 Rani Padmabai (wife of Shiv Hari Rao)
 Rani Sakku Bai (wife of Krishna Rao and mother of Ramchandra Rao; Gangadhar's elder sister in law)
 Rani Janki Bai (first wife of Raghunath Rao III and his Royal consort; Gangadhar's younger sister in law)
 Rani Lachcho Bai (second wife of Raghunath Rao III; Gangadhar's sister in law )
 Rani Rama Bai (Gangadhar Rao's first wife)
 Rani Lakshmi Bai (Gangadhar Rao's second wife and mother of Damodar Rao)

Other notable people
 Ranunath Rao of Jhansi (a.k.a.  Raghunath Hari Newalkar)
 Shiv Hari Rao
 Shiv Rao Bhau (father of Krishna Rao I, Raghunath Rao III, and Gangadhar Rao) 
 Krishna Rao I (father of Ramachandra Rao and husband of Sakku Bai (Gangadhar Rao's brother)
 Krishna Rao II (adopted son of Ramchandra Rao and biological son of Ganga Bai of Sagar who was a daughter of Sakku Bai)
 Ali Bahadur and Nasrat Jung (Raghunath Rao III and Lachcho Bai's illegitimate sons)
 Raghunath Rao III  (brother of Gangadhar and Krishna Rao)
 Sadashiv Rao (distant relative and nephew of Gangadhar Rao; executed in 1870)(Rani Lakshmi Bai's brother-in-law)
 Vasudev Rao Newalkar, a cousin of Raja Gangadhar Rao 
 JhalkariBai (Women's Army served Rani Lakshmi Bai of Jhansi )
 Ghulam Ghaus Khan (Commander in Chief of Jhansi)
 Tatya Tope (Rani Lakshmi Bai 's Guru)

Newalkars Today
Most of the Newalkar family has migrated from Jhansi to various cities in Maharashtra and Madhya Pradesh. There is only one Branch of Newalkar family still residing in Jhansi. The members are well known for their humanitarian work and are affiliated with various humanitarian organizations which provide free health care to poor people by organizing health camps and also provide aid to schools for underprivileged children. Priti Newalkar was the President of Lions Club of Jhansi for 2020 - 2021 and Manish Newalkar has served as the President of Rotary Club Of Jhansi Rani for 2021 - 2022.

References

Bibliography

Jhansi
History of Uttar Pradesh